Petter Alexis Askergren, (born 25 May 1974), who simply uses his given name Petter as a stage name, is a rap artist from Stockholm, Sweden, rapping in Swedish. He debuted in 1998 with the album Mitt sjätte sinne (My Sixth Sense), which became a success and started the Swedish hip hop boom in the late 1990s and early 2000s. He owns a record company called Bananrepubliken. He also studied art history at Uppsala University for some time. He has also worked with the famous Norwegian rap producer Tommy Tee several times in his career. Petter also frequently works with Swedish disk jockey Patrik Elofsson who goes by the stage name DJ Sleepy.

In 2014 he hosted Musikhjälpen in Uppsala.

Personal life 
Petter was diagnosed with ADHD in 2011.

Discography

Studio albums

Compilation albums

Remix albums 
 2007: Skruvat och choppat av Afasi

EPs 
 2019: Så mycket bättre – Tolkningarna

Singles

Featured singles

Other charted songs 

Notes

See also
Swedish hip hop

References

External links

1974 births
Living people
Petter
Uppsala University alumni
Swedish-language singers
Musicians from Stockholm